Blind Lake is a science fiction novel by Canadian writer Robert Charles Wilson. It was published in 2003, and won a Prix Aurora Award for Best Long Form and was nominated for the Hugo Award for Best Novel, both in 2004.

Plot summary
The novel deals with a government installation at Blind Lake, Minnesota, where scientists observe sentient life on a planet 51 light-years away, using telescopes powered by Bose-Einstein condensate-based quantum computers that have advanced beyond human understanding. A sudden and unexplained facility lockdown extends into a long-term quarantine. Observation department head Marguerite Hauser tries to carry on with her work studying the alien life while taking care of her socially-challenged daughter Tess, warding off her ex-husband Ray, and deciding how she feels about houseguest and disgraced journalist Chris.

References

External links
 
 Blind Lake at Worlds Without End

2003 American novels
Novels by Robert Charles Wilson
2003 science fiction novels
American science fiction novels
Novels set in Minnesota
Tor Books books